Mikkeli Airport  is located in Mikkeli, Finland,  west of the city centre.
There are no regular scheduled flights to the airport. In the summer, there are a large number of gliding, powered flight and parachute jumping activities at the airport.

Runway 11 is also equipped with an instrument landing system.

References

External links

Mikkeli Airport
AIP Finland – Mikkeli Airport

Picture gallery

Airports in Finland
Airport
Buildings and structures in South Savo